The Parti Québécois (PQ) fielded a full slate of 125 candidates in the 2008 Quebec provincial election and elected fifty-one members to emerge as the Official Opposition party in the national assembly.

Candidates (incomplete)

References

2008